Auguste Clément Joseph Herst (18 August 1825, Rocroi - after 1888) was a French watercolour and oil painter who exhibited at the Salon of 1861 and at later exhibitions. Between ca. 1840 and 1860 he lived in Scheveningen in the Netherlands. Landscape paintings included Boulogne-sur-Mer, Marseilles, La Grande Chartreuse (near Grenoble), Fontainebleau, Savoy and Normandy. He was one of the teachers in Paris of Armand Point. He was last cited in 1888.

References

External links

http://www.artnet.com/artists/auguste-clement-joseph-herst/past-auction-results

1825 births
Year of death unknown
French landscape painters
French watercolourists
French expatriates in the Netherlands
People from Ardennes (department)